The University of Washington School of Dentistry is the dental school of the University of Washington. It is located in Seattle, and is the only school of dentistry in the state of Washington. The school emphasizes research in anxiety, orofacial pain, tissue repair and regeneration, immune response to bacteria, and practice based research.

Federal grants
In 2015, the University of Washington School of Dentistry was ranked 21st out of 48 dental schools receiving federal grants from the National Institute of Dental and Craniofacial Research.

Departments 
Department of Endodontics
Department of Oral Health Sciences
Department of Oral Medicine
Department of Oral and Maxillofacial Surgery
Department of Orthodontics
Department of Pediatric Dentistry
Department of Periodontics
Department of Restorative Dentistry

Accreditation 
The University of Washington School of Dentistry is currently accredited by ADA.

See also
American Student Dental Association

References 

Dentistry
Educational institutions established in 1945
Dental schools in Washington (state)
1945 establishments in Washington (state)